Coleophora dorita is a moth of the family Coleophoridae.

References

dorita
Moths described in 1999